Stakenborg is a hamlet in the Dutch province of Groningen. It is a part of the municipality of Westerwolde, and lies about 33 km northeast of Emmen.

The hamlet was first mentioned between 1851 and 1855 as Stakenburg, and is a combination of a thin pole and borg (castle). The postal authorities have placed it under Bourtange. Stakenborg has place name signs.

References

Populated places in Groningen (province)
Westerwolde (municipality)